The president of the Bundestag ( or ) presides over the sessions of the Bundestag, the federal parliament of Germany, with functions similar to that of a speaker in other countries. In the German order of precedence, the office is ranked second after the president and before the chancellor.

The current office-holder is Bärbel Bas (SPD), who was elected during the first session of the 20th Bundestag on 26 October 2021.

Election and customs 
The president of the Bundestag is elected during the constituent session of each election period after the federal elections or in a later session, if the office has fallen vacant, by all members of the Bundestag. The president has to be a member of the Bundestag. Until the election of the president, the session is chaired by the father of the House, the so-called Alterspräsident. Since 2017, this has been the longest serving member of the Bundestag; in 1949-2017, it was the oldest member of the Bundestag by age.

Usually, the president of the Bundestag is a member of the largest parliamentary group. This constitutional convention had emerged already in times of the Weimar Republic, but this is not required by law. The term ends with the election period, and there is no provision for an early removal. The term of the president can only end prematurely if they resign the position, leaves the Bundestag or dies. They can be reelected in the next election period provided they become a member of the Bundestag again.

Traditionally, the president of the Bundestag is elected uncontested. The only exception so far has been in 1954 after the unexpected death of Hermann Ehlers. Ernst Lemmer competed with the "official" CDU/CSU candidate, Eugen Gerstenmaier, and lost after three ballots with a difference of 14 votes (204 for Gerstenmaier, 190 for Lemmer, 15 abstentions).

Presidium of the Bundestag 

The president of the Bundestag has several deputies, the vice presidents of the Bundestag ( or ), who are supplied by the other parliamentary groups. The number of vice presidents was not fixed in the Bundestag's Geschäftsordnung (rules of order) until 1994, when it was decided that each parliamentary group should be represented by at least one vice president. However, no AfD candidate for vice president has been elected for the 20th Bundestag. There is some controversy over this cordon sanitaire imposed against the far-right AfD, but the Federal Constitutional Court of Germany has ruled that even though the rules of order of the Bundestag give the AfD the right to a Vice-Presidential post, there is no obligation for any given member of the Bundestag to vote for any given candidate for Vice-President of the Bundestag and the office requires election by a majority vote of the Bundestag. Together, the president and the vice presidents make up the Presidium of the Bundestag.

In the current 20th Bundestag, the vice presidents are:

 Aydan Özoğuz (SPD)
 Yvonne Magwas (CDU/CSU)
 Katrin Göring-Eckardt (Bündnis 90/Die Grünen)
 Wolfgang Kubicki (FDP)
 Petra Pau (Die Linke)

Legal background
The legal foundation for the office is Article 40 of the Basic Law which states that the Bundestag elects a president and vice presidents and is to give itself rules of order. Due to a 1952 Federal Constitutional Court decision, the Geschäftsordnung has to be enacted afresh in every election period, but usually the old rules are reenacted without change. The Geschäftsordnung specifies the duties of the president of the Bundestag and his vice presidents as well as their number.

Duties
The president's most important duty is to chair the sessions of the Bundestag. The president determines the order of speakers and opens and closes the debates, and ensures that debates take place in an orderly fashion. In the case of grave disruption, they may exclude a member of parliament for up to 30 session days. All draft legislation initiated by the Federal Government, the Bundestag or the Bundesrat is addressed to the president, as well as all submissions and petitions from within or addressed to the Bundestag. The president of the Bundestag also chairs the Council of Elders, which manages the internal affairs of the Bundestag. For the election of a new Federal president, the president of the Bundestag convenes and chairs the Bundesversammlung.

Additionally, the president receives the statements of account of the political parties, monitors party financing and regulates campaign cost reimbursement. The president also has police power over the premises of the parliament and oversees its police force, can veto any search and seizure there to protect the independence of the parliament, and acts as the employer of the Bundestag's public servants.

List of presidents
Political parties

Books
Michael F. Feldkamp (ed.), Der Bundestagspräsident. Amt - Funktion - Person. 16. Wahlperiode, München 2007,

References

 
Bundestag
Bundestag